Pablo Roberto Munhoz Rodríguez (born 31 August 1982 in Rivera) is a Uruguayan football midfielder playing for Tabaré Pireápolis F.C..

Club career
Munhoz played much of his early career with Defensor Sporting in the Uruguayan Primera División before signing in 2004 with Croatian HNK Hajduk Split where he will play three seasons and help them win the 2005 Championship. In summer 2007 he went back to Uruguay to play with Uruguayan club Club Nacional de Football but by the end of the year he was on his way to China to sign with Wuhan Optics Valley F.C. (known until then as Wuhan Guanggu). However, that season the club was withdrew from the Chinese Super League and in consequence was punished by the Chinese Federation. Munhoz left China and returned to Uruguay playing for a number of clubs, such as Juventud de Las Piedras, Atenas de San Carlos and in 2010 he signed for El Tanque Sisley returning to the Uruguayan top league. In the summer of 2011 he returned to Europe, this time to play with GC Biaschesi in the Swiss 1. Liga Group 3. He joined Brazilian club CRAC on January 3, 2012.

Between 2013 and 2016 Munhoz spent three seasons in the second tier of Uruguayan football, playing for Huracán F.C., Progreso, and Deportivo Maldonado. As of 2017 Munhoz was in Piriápolis, running his Negrol football school for children and playing for the local lower-tier team Tabaré Piriápolis F.C..

International career
Munhoz made two appearances for the Uruguay national team in 2003.

References

External links
 Pablo Munhoz at Tenfieldigital. 

1982 births
Living people
People from Rivera Department
Uruguayan footballers
Uruguay international footballers
Association football midfielders
Defensor Sporting players
Club Nacional de Football players
Juventud de Las Piedras players
Atenas de San Carlos players
El Tanque Sisley players
HNK Hajduk Split players
Croatian Football League players
Expatriate footballers in Brazil
Expatriate footballers in Croatia
Wuhan Guanggu players
Chinese Super League players
Expatriate footballers in China
Uruguayan expatriate sportspeople in China
Expatriate footballers in Switzerland
Uruguayan expatriate footballers
Uruguayan expatriate sportspeople in Brazil
Uruguayan expatriate sportspeople in Switzerland